Chahar Murun-e Tamdari (also Romanized as Chahār Mūrūn-e Tamdārī; also known as Chahār Morūn and Chahār Mūrūn) is a village in Margown Rural District, Margown District, Boyer-Ahmad County, Kohgiluyeh and Boyer-Ahmad Province, Iran. At the 2006 census, its population was 41, in 6 families.

References 

Populated places in Boyer-Ahmad County